The Crown of Scotland is a hill in the Scottish Borders, Scotland.

At a relatively small elevation from the surrounding peaks, it is situated to the north of the Devil's Beef Tub and the town of Moffat.

The hill's unusual name derives from the alliance made between Robert the Bruce and James Douglas, Lord of Douglas upon its summit in 1306, following the former's murder of the Red Comyn at Greyfriars kirk in Dumfries, and when Bruce was on his way to Scone to be crowned by Bishop William de Lamberton.

Development
In 2008 a planning application was made to erect 36 wind turbines concentrated on the summit and its surrounding peaks. This application was rejected following much local objection. Currently (December 2011) a revised plan for 24 turbines is in process.

References

External links

Windpower developers site

Mountains and hills of Dumfries and Galloway
Mountains and hills of the Southern Uplands